Paul Kenneth Canoville (born 4 March 1962) is an English former professional footballer who played as a winger.

He was signed by Chelsea from Hillingdon Borough in 1981, and went on to win the Second Division title with the club in 1983–84. He was the first black player to play for Chelsea, and received a negative reception from racist elements amongst Chelsea supporters. He was sold to Reading for £60,000 in August 1986, before retiring from the professional game due to a serious knee injury the following year. He later had spells with non-league clubs Enfield, Maidenhead United, Northwood, and Egham Town. After retiring he beat crack cocaine addiction and cancer, and penned an award-winning autobiography in 2008.

Playing career
Paul Kenneth Canoville was born to Udine Patricia "Patsy" Lake on 4 March 1962 at 10 Albert Road, Southall. His mother emigrated to England from Anguilla and his father had come from the Commonwealth of Dominica. His mother raised him and his sister June alone, as his father had no interest in raising a family. As a teenager he played truant from school and was sent to three months in borstal after he became involved in petty crime. When his mother moved in with her boyfriend in Slough in 1979 Canoville slept rough and in hostels, and at one hostel was falsely accused of rape.

Canoville started out playing semi-professionally for Southern League side Hillingdon Borough, and slept in an abandoned car as he had nowhere to stay. At Borough he was moved from centre-half to the wings, where his pace was a greater asset. After two successful seasons with the club he had trials with Southampton and Chelsea.

Chelsea
Canoville signed for John Neal's Chelsea in December 1981; he was paid £175 a week and Hillingdon Borough received a £5,000 fee. Though violence and discrimination were rife in British football at the time, Chelsea in particular had a reputation for racism. He made his debut against Crystal Palace at Selhurst Park on 12 April 1982, coming on as a late substitute for Clive Walker, who had scored the only goal of the game.

He ended the 1981–82 season with two late substitute appearances, replacing Peter Rhoades-Brown on the right-wing on both occasions. He enjoyed a run of six games at the start of the 1982–83 season before he was sidelined with a thigh injury. He scored his first goal for the club with a volley in a 1–1 draw with Fulham. With Chelsea facing relegation into the Third Division, Canoville was returned to the first team towards the end of the campaign and helped the club to secure enough points to avoid relegation. He gradually won over the majority of supporters to the point that his name was sung by Chelsea fans, though the racist abuse continued for years.

Scottish winger Pat Nevin was signed for the 1983–84 season. Though Nevin and Canoville were rivals for the same position they became good friends off the pitch, and Nevin was the only Chelsea player to publicly defend Canoville from the racist abuse he received. Canoville had a good start to the season, and scored a hat-trick against Swansea City on 6 December. However the next month Neal signed left-footed winger Mickey Thomas, which reduced Canoville's first team opportunities. Chelsea won promotion to the First Division as champions of the Second Division, and Canoville scored seven goals in 25 appearances.

He was in excellent form in the first half of the 1984–85 campaign, but picked up an injury against Stoke City in December and started just further matches upon his recovery. He did though put in a memorable performance against Sheffield Wednesday in a League Cup fifth-round replay at Hillsborough on 30 January, he replaced Colin Lee at half-time with Wednesday 3–0 ahead and scored the first goal of the Chelsea comeback before putting the "Blues" 4–3 ahead, though Wednesday scored a last minute equaliser. After that game he met his father – who had settled in Sheffield – for the first time in 21 years. Chelsea ended the season in sixth place, and Canoville had scored four goals in 35 games.

New manager John Hollins brought in Jerry Murphy from Crystal Palace to play on the left-side of midfield; the signing particularly angered Canoville as Murphy had a significantly better contract. Jerry Murphy was signed on a free transfer from Crystal Palace. Murphy did not settle well in the first team, allowing Canoville a return to the starting line-up by September. However, he struggled with injuries and with numerous other midfielders all vying for places at Stamford Bridge he played just 19 games in the 1985–86 season. He also became unsettled at the club after fighting a teammate who had racially abused him following a night of heavy drinking. At the end of the season he agreed a move to Brentford, but ended up at Reading after the latter club made a late bid for his services.

Reading
Canoville was sold to Second Division Reading in August 1986 for £60,000. He saw the move as a fresh start away from the racist abuse he had received at Chelsea, and he was more respected at Reading due to his experience in the First Division. However, he ruptured his cruciate ligament in a clash with Sunderland's Dave Swindlehurst at Roker Park on 21 October and was ruled out for the rest of the 1986–87 season. After ten months of recovery he was fit enough to be included in manager Ian Branfoot's first team plans for the 1987–88 season. He scored in a 3–0 win against Oldham Athletic at Elm Park but his knee caused him to leave the game after 65 minutes. He went on to feature a total of eight times that season, including in a League Cup win over former club Chelsea at Stamford Bridge, but was never able to fully regain match fitness. In November 1987 his knee gave way again and Canoville announced his retirement from professional football.

Later career
He moved down to non-league football, making appearances for Enfield, Maidenhead United and Burnham. He also played 12 league and cup games for Northwood in the 1992–93 season. He later played for Egham Town despite suffering from drug addiction.

Style of play
Canoville had pace, good crossing ability and contributed goals from the left-wing.

Personal life
A self-confessed womaniser, he has fathered eleven children through ten different women. His children are: Natalie (born 1979 to Christine), Derry (born May 1982 to Maureen), Dwayne, Lorreen (born April 1985 to Marsha), Germelle (born May 1985 to Valerie), Jahmal (born January 1991), Pierre (born 26 December 1986 to Maria), Udine (born January 1988 to Joyce), Nickel (born 23 February 1988 to Suzy), Paris (born 13 September 1992 to Tracey), Tye Paul (born 20 December 1995, also to Tracey), and Caysey (born 3 November 1995 to Sonia). He met most of the women through the London rave and acid house party scene. Tye, died in infancy in 1995 from a heart defect.

By 1989 he had begun taking crack cocaine, and within a few years he became an addict. He had built a good career as a DJ after retiring as a footballer, but sold his records and equipment to pay for crack. He spent most of 1996 in rehab. In 1996, he was diagnosed with Non-Hodgkin lymphoma, an aggressive form of cancer which attacks the immune system. He underwent a course of chemotherapy for the illness and made a full recovery. In 1999, he moved to the Caribbean island of Saint Martin, but soon began taking crack on the island and returned to London. In 2004, he entered rehab for a second time, at which point his cancer returned; by March 2005 he was again free of drugs and his cancer was in remission.

After two years working as a driver for disabled children, he became a classroom assistant in November 2007. Canoville's memoir, Black And Blue, (co-written with Rick Glanvill) was published in March 2008. It won a number of awards include Best Autobiography in the National Sporting Club's 2009 Book Awards, and Best Autobiography in the 2009 British Sports Book Awards. In March 2015 Sky Sports aired a documentary film chronicling his life story entitled Black & Blue: The Paul Canoville Story. In July 2018 it was the subject of discussion on BBC Radio 4's A Good Read.

Career statistics

Honours
Chelsea
 Football League Second Division: 1983–84

References
Specific

General

1962 births
Living people
Footballers from Southall
English people of Anguillan descent
English people of Dominica descent
English footballers
Black British sportsmen
Association football wingers
Hillingdon Borough F.C. players
Chelsea F.C. players
Reading F.C. players
Enfield F.C. players
Maidenhead United F.C. players
Burnham F.C. players
Northwood F.C. players
Egham Town F.C. players
Southern Football League players
English Football League players
National League (English football) players
Isthmian League players
English DJs
English autobiographers